William (Sonny) E. Walters (5 September 1924 – 25 November 1970) was an English professional footballer who played on the wing for Tottenham Hotspur and subsequently for Aldershot Town during the 1940s and 1950s.

Career

Sonny Walters was assigned to Tottenham Juniors in 1939, representing the Walthamstow Avenue team and netting 24 goals during the 1943–44 season. He signed professional forms in September 1944, clocking up 50 wartime appearances, netting 14 goals, until serving in the army from 1945–47. Whilst based in Northern Ireland he guested for Derry City as well as facing the French Army, Belgian Army, RAF and Royal Navy in representative matches. 

He played for Tottenham Hotspur between 1947 and 1957 and in 1949 he gained a regular spot in the Tottenham Hotspur league team. He got his break when he was selected to replace Freddie Cox who transferred to Arsenal and was quick to make an impression. Scoring on his debut in January 1947 in a 2-0 victory over West Bromwich Albion at White Hart Lane.  He was part of manager Arthur Rowe's exciting 'Push and Run' side which won the Football League Second Division in 1950 and, in the year following promotion, the Football League First Division in 1951. He played alongside Bill Nicholson, Alf Ramsey, captain Ronnie Burgess, Ted Ditchburn in goal and Len Duquemin. During his time at Spurs he made 234 appearances scoring 71 goals. On 24 January 1953 Sonny scored the club's 1,500th League goal at White Hart Lane in a 2–1 win against Sheffield Wednesday.

His name was immortalised in the 1950s Spurs chant "We are the Spurs Supporters and we love to watch them play" (sung to the tune of McNamara's Band) with the lines...... The ref his whistle proudly blows the linesmen wave their flags, The Duke is ready to kick off as he hitches up his bags, We cheer Sonny Walters as he toddles down the line, And the ball like magic is in the net and makes us all feel fine.

In July 1957 he transferred to Aldershot Town where he played for them 66 times scoring 11 goals.

He gained only one international honour when selected to play for England "B" against The Netherlands at Newcastle on 22 February 1950.

He retired from the game in 1959.

Honours
Tottenham Hotspur
 Football League First Division: 1950–51

Notes

English footballers
Tottenham Hotspur F.C. players
Aldershot F.C. players
Association football wingers
English Football League players
1924 births
1970 deaths
British Army personnel of World War II